Tamires Anselmo Costa (born 2 May 1990) is a Brazilian handballer for Balonmano Salud Tenerife  and the Brazilian national team.

Achievements
Pan American Women's Club Handball Championship: 2017

References

1990 births
Living people
Brazilian female handball players
South American Games gold medalists for Brazil
South American Games medalists in handball
Competitors at the 2018 South American Games
21st-century Brazilian women